Puerto Montt (Mapuche: Meli Pulli) is a port city and commune in southern Chile, located at the northern end of the Reloncaví Sound in the Llanquihue Province, Los Lagos Region, 1,055 km to the south of the capital, Santiago. It is bounded by the communes of Puerto Varas to the north, Cochamó to the east and southeast, Calbuco to the southwest and Maullín and Los Muermos to the west.

Founded as late as 1853 during the German colonization of southern Chile, Puerto Montt soon outgrew older neighboring cities through its strategic position at the southern end of the Chilean Central Valley being a gateway city into the Chiloé Archipelago, the Llanquihue and Nahuel Huapi lakes and Western Patagonia.

Puerto Montt has gained renown and grown significantly through the rise of Chile to become the second largest salmon producer of the world during the 1990s and 2000s. However, the Chilean salmon aquaculture crisis of the late 2000s resulted in severe unemployment and exposed weaknesses in the local economy. The city's cultural endowment mixes elements of Chiloé culture with a German heritage. The city has attracted a significant number of newcomers from all over Chile in the last 30 years in search of employment opportunities.

History
Originally, the site was covered by thick forest and was called Melipulli (which means "four hills" in Mapudungun). It was selected as an entrance to Lake Llanquihue when its proximity to the open sea was discovered. The expedition was entrusted to Bernardo Philippi, a German naturalist and cartographer, but after his death in 1851, Vicente Perez Rosales took over his duties, and by the end of September started to chop trees at Reloncaví sound using local woodsman coming from Huar, Maillen, Huelmo and Calbuco Mainly. By December, after the forest was cut down, the area was burned to clear the land in anticipation of completing the settlement plan. The city itself was founded on February 12, 1853, after government-sponsored immigration from Germany that began in 1848 populated the region and integrated it politically to the rest of the country. It was named after Manuel Montt, President of Chile between 1851 and 1861, who set in motion the German immigration.

In 1912 the city was connected by train to Santiago, making it an important point of entry into Chilean Patagonia and augmenting its commercial development. By 1950 it had a population of 27,500, and the city was rapidly urbanizing. However, the 1960 Valdivia earthquake destroyed much of Puerto Montt, collapsing the port and the train station along with many building and houses. Eventually the city recovered, becoming once again an important urban centre as well as a port of national interest.

1969 violence

At the start of March 1969, approximately 90 landless persons received advice from Socialist member of parliament Luis Espinoza due to the local authority never granting them any land they needed to build homes.  On March 4, 1969, they settled on farmland belonging to an absentee landlord. Having been denied titles by the local authorities, these families simply moved onto the empty, unoccupied land. They did so seeking squatters' rights, and without making any payment of rent.  Some four or five days later, the local Police Chief Rolando Rodríguez Marbán reassured the squatters that they would not be disturbed and could proceed with their home construction.  However, a change of plans by the ministry of the interior quickly led to new orders.

At midnight on March 9, Luis Espinoza was charged with breaking the law, arrested, and moved to the city of Valdivia.  Following direct orders from Interior Minister Edmundo Pérez Zujovic, 250 armed policemen launched an assault on the squatting families that dawn.  Eight of the landless persons were shot dead and two, a 9-month child and an adult, died afterwards. All of the newly built homes were burned to the ground. The massacre is poignantly memorialized by singer-songwriter Víctor Jara in his song Preguntas por Puerto Montt.

The massacre of Puerto Montt and the public outcry that followed were major factors contributing to the defeat of Eduardo Frei's party in the Chilean presidential election of 1970 which was succeeded by Salvador Allende's Unidad Popular.

Late 20th century

By 1979 Puerto Montt was nominated and later become the Capital of Los Lagos Region, thereby becoming the principal administrative, political and commercial centre of Southern Chile.

Demographics
According to the 2017 census, Puerto Montt has 245,902 inhabitants (121,019 men and 124,883 women), of which 25,759 live in rural areas and 220,143 live in urban areas. From 218,858 inhabitants in the 2012 census, the population grew by 12.36% (27,044 people).

Of the overall population, 52,483 belong to indigenous groups, with 50,247 being Mapuche, 314 Aymara people, 73 Rapa Nui people, 19 Lican Antai, 84 Quechua people, 27 Colla, 136 Diaguita, 114 Kawésqar, 38 Yahgan, 175 other and 1,256 declaring indigenous status but not identifying a group.

About 1.46% of the population (3,595 people) are immigrants, with 199 reporting originating from Peru, 596 from Colombia, 269 from Venezuela, 40 from Bolivia, 1,527 from Argentina, 44 from Haiti, 194 from Ecuador, 157 from South America, 153 from Central America and the Caribbean, 52 from North America, 242 from Europe, 83 from Asia, 16 from Africa, 6 from Oceania and 17 not declaring.

Climate 
Puerto Montt has a wet oceanic climate (Köppen: Cfb) with heavy rainfall throughout the year but a drying trend in the summer. Although temperatures are consistently below , frosts are very rare and occur only a couple of times per month in the winter. For the 41st parallel south, closer to the equator than to the south pole, Puerto Montt is much cooler than areas further inland in terms of summer temperatures, due to cool ocean currents nearby. This is compounded by the lack of a sizeable landmass on those parallels in the southern hemisphere. That means that Puerto Montt has much cooler summers than areas at similar distances from the equator in the northern hemisphere.

Economy

Puerto Montt is the capital of the Los Lagos Region and the Llanquihue Province, and the main sea port at the lower end of Chile's western continental land. The city is the principal commercial, services, and financial hub of the Chilean Northern Patagonia—Zona Austral. As the geographic region's main port, Puerto Montt is often considered the 'capital' of Chilean Patagonia.

Puerto Montt is also the gateway to the Chiloé Archipelago and Chiloé Island across the Chacao Channel, and the many other smaller islands in Chile's inland Sea of Chiloé.

The city's economy is now based upon agriculture, cattle, and forestry on the surrounding islands, and fishing and salmon aquaculture in the fjords and nearby Pacific Ocean.

Salmon aquaculture
The city is configured as the hub of one of the largest salmon aquaculture industries in the world. Hatcheries, fisheries and packing plants are mostly located south of Puerto Montt. Fresh salmon is flown daily to world markets and frozen salmon is shipped by ocean to all destinations. The tremendous growth of the region, mainly due to the salmon industry, but also due to rapid expansion of forestry, cattle, and tourism, has proven the massive economic potential of Puerto Montt and its surrounding area.

Airports
El Tepual Airport is the main commercial airport serving the city. Three airlines operate regular flights to and from Santiago, Punta Arenas, Balmaceda, and Antofagasta. The airlines operating at the airport are Latam Airlines (the country's largest), Sky Airline and JetSmart. The flight time to Santiago is approximately two hours.

Additionally, Marcel Marchant Aerodrome (La Paloma) connects the city with remote locations within the Patagonian Fjords.

Administration
As a commune, Puerto Montt is a third-level administrative division of Chile administered by a municipal council, headed by an Alcalde with 10 councilors and represented in the Chamber of Deputies by 5 members and in the Senate by 2 people and with support of a Regional Council of 6 members.

Since 2012 the current Mayor has been Gervoy Paredes Rojas who was reelected at 2016 Municipal elections with an end term up to 2020 and the current members of the council are Fernado España España (PS), Sonia Hernandez Asencio (PS), Luis Matamala Almonacid (PDC), Veronica Sanchez Silva (PDC), Juan Carlos Cuitiño Uribe (GEP), Rodrigo Wainraihgt Galilea (RN), Fernando Orellana Perez (RN), Marcia Muñoz Cochifas (IND), Hector Ulloa Aguilera (PPD) and Leonardo Gonzales Saez (PPD).

Within the electoral division of Chile, representatives of Puerto Montt, District 26 (Puerto Montt, Cochamó, Maullín, Calbuco, Castro, Ancud, Quemchi, Dalcahue, Curaco de Vélez, Quinchao, Puqueldón, Chonchi, Queilén, Quellón, Chaitén, Hualaihué, Futaleufú and Palena)  in the Chambers of Deputies 2018-2022 are Jenny Álvarez Vera (PS), Gabriel Ascencio Mansilla (PDC), Alejandro Santana Tirachini (RN), Carlos Kuschel Silva (RN) and Alejandro Bernales (Liberal Party). 
The current Representatives in the Senate period 2014-2022 are Rabindranath Quinteros Lara (PS) and  Ivan Moreira Barros (UDI).
Regional councilors members 2018-2022 are Ricardo Kuschel Silva (RN), Jaime Brahm Barril (RN), Juan Ortiz Roble (UDI), Manuel Rivera Altamirano (PS), Juan Carcamo Carcamo (PDC) and Valentina Alvarez (Ind/PPD).

Education
Puerto Montt has 175 registered schools varying from educational levels such as pre-school, primary school, secondary school, special school as well as technical-professional and adult schools.

 Arabe Siria School is a Catholic, public school teaching from pre-school to primary school.
 Alerce Rural School is a Catholic, public school from pre-school to primary school with some support to children with special needs.
 Angelmo Elementary School is a public school with education levels from pre-school to primary school with support to children with special needs.
 Adventist Private School is a religious, private and subsidized school owned by  Seventh-day Adventist Church Corporation and teach from pre-school to primary school.
The British School Patagonia is part of Red de colegios Patagonia and a private and subsidized school, from pre-school to secondary school
 Pumahue School, member of Cognita School is a private, non-subsidized school, from pre-school to secondary school.
 Salesiano Padre Jose Fernández Perez, is a Catholic, private and subsided school, that ranging from pre-school to secondary school with support to children with special needs, as well as technical and adults school.
 Deutsche Schule (German Institute) of Puerto Montt is a private, non-subsidized school member of DS CHILE "Association of German schools in Chile" with an international exchange and support from Germany, teaching from pre-school to secondary school.
 Industrial Lyceum of Puerto Montt is a public, secondary school with a focus on technical professions.
 Lafquen Montessori School, Known to use Montessori method is a private and subsidized school, from pre-school to secondary-school with support to children with special needs.
 Mother Isabel Larragaña Adult school is a Catholic and Private school with a primary and secondary school program for adults.
 Joaquin de los Andes Auditory and Language Special School is an holistic, private and subsidized school for pre-school children with SLI and  Deafness.

Universities
Universidad de Los Lagos, Campus Puerto Montt (Chinquihue)
Universidad Austral de Chile (UACh), Campus Puerto Montt
Universidad San Sebastián, Campus Patagonia
Universidad Santo Tomás, Campus Puerto Montt

Notable people

Bordemar, group of folkloric music.
Raúl Ruiz, Chilean filmmaker.
Enrique Paris, physician and politician who served as Minister of Health of Chile between 2020 and 2022.
María Luisa Cordero, Chilean television presenter and psychologist.
Rodolfo Stange, politician and former senator, member of the Government Junta during the Military Dictatorship of Chile.

Gallery

References

Notes

External links
 Tourism Official Website

 
 Municipality of Puerto Montt 
 Puerto Montt City Guide

See also
 Tenglo Island

 
Communes of Chile
Port cities in Chile
Capitals of Chilean regions
Capitals of Chilean provinces
Populated places established in 1853
Populated places in Llanquihue Province
1853 establishments in Chile
Coasts of Los Lagos Region